Panagiotis Ladas (born 26 August 1994) is a Greek professional footballer who plays as a goalkeeper for Gamma Ethniki club Kallithea. Ladas has also represented his country internationally playing with the Greek U19 national football team.

Club career
Ladas started his football with Argonaftis Katakolou. He subsequently moved to Asteras Tripoli in 2010 where he failed to make a first team appearance. On 19 August 2014 he signed for Football League outfit Iraklis. Ladas made his full professional debut for Iraklis in a Greek Cup match against Ethnikos Gazoros.

After a short stint with Gamma Ethniki side Doxa Nea Manolada, Ladas signed with Belgian First Amateur Division side KFC Oosterzonen in the summer of 2016. He returned to Greece and the Greek Football League a year later, signing with Cretan club Ergotelis.

International career
Ladas has received three caps for Greece U19.

Career statistics

References

External links
 
Myplayer.gr profile

1994 births
Living people
Iraklis Thessaloniki F.C. players
Asteras Tripolis F.C. players
Ergotelis F.C. players
Kallithea F.C. players
Greek footballers
Greece youth international footballers
Greek expatriate footballers
Association football goalkeepers
Expatriate footballers in the Netherlands
Greek expatriate sportspeople in the Netherlands
Lierse Kempenzonen players
Footballers from Pyrgos, Elis